Thomas Clutterbuck  (1697 – 23 November 1742) was a British politician who sat in the British House of Commons from 1722 to 1742 and in the Parliament of Ireland from 1725 to 1742.

Clutterbuck was the eldest son of Thomas Clutterbuck of Ingatestone, Essex and his wife Bridgett Exton, daughter of Sir Thomas Exton, LLD, one of the Six Clerks in Chancery. He matriculated at Christ Church, Oxford on  20 October 1713, aged 16 and was admitted at Middle Temple in 1713. He married Henrietta Cuffe Tollemache, daughter of Lord Huntingtower ion 1 May 1731.

Clutterbuck was returned as Member of Parliament  for Liskeard at the 1722 British general election. He was returned again at the 1727 British general election. At the 1734 British general election he was returned again as MP  for Plympton Erle He was returned again at the 1741 British general election. From 1724 to 1730 he was Chief Secretary to the Lord Carteret as Lord Lieutenant of Ireland 
and was also Member of the Parliament of Ireland for Lisburn from 1725 to 1742 He was Lord of the Admiralty from 1732 to 1741, Lord of the Treasury from 1741 to 1742, and Treasurer of the navy from 1742. He was made a Privy Councillor on 24 June 1742.

Clutterbuck died on 23 November 1742 leaving a son and three daughters.

References

1697 births
1742 deaths
Chief Secretaries for Ireland
Irish MPs 1727–1760
Lords of the Admiralty
Members of the Privy Council of Great Britain
British MPs 1722–1727
British MPs 1727–1734
British MPs 1734–1741
British MPs 1741–1747
Irish MPs 1715–1727
Members of the Parliament of Great Britain for constituencies in Cornwall
Members of the Parliament of Great Britain for Plympton Erle
Members of the Parliament of Ireland (pre-1801) for County Down constituencies